City Honors High School (CHHS) also known as City Honors International Preparatory School, is a charter high school in the Inglewood Unified School District (IUSD), serving grades 9–12.

City Honors International Preparatory School (CHIPS) received another 6-year accreditation by the Western Association of Schools and Colleges (WASC) in 2022. (2022-2028)

City Honors High School is a school on the corner of 120 W Regent Street and Queen Street in Downtown Inglewood.

City Honors is a college preparatory charter school and is designed to allow their students to graduate from high school with an AA along with their high school diploma.

Notable students

Donald Sanford, American-Israeli Olympic sprinter

External links

References

High schools in Los Angeles County, California
Schools in Inglewood, California
Public high schools in California
Educational institutions established in 2005
2005 establishments in California